Johnson Township is an inactive township in Oregon County, in the U.S. state of Missouri.

Johnson Township has the name of James Johnson, a pioneer citizen.

References

Townships in Missouri
Townships in Oregon County, Missouri